Ronald Guzman may refer to:
Ronald A. Guzman, United States federal judge
Ronald Guzmán, baseball player